Allan Chapman may refer to:

Allan Chapman (historian) (born 1946), British historian of science
Allan Chapman (politician) (1897–1966), Scottish Unionist Member of Parliament 1935–1945

See also
Allen Chapman
Allen Chapman (American football)